Nisf Jubeil ( also spelled Nisf Jbeil or Nisf Jubayl) is a Palestinian village in the Nablus Governorate in the northern West Bank, located northwest of Nablus. According to the Palestinian Central Bureau of Statistics (PCBS) census, it had a population of 394 in 2007. There were a total of 83 households and 17 business establishments.

Geography
Nisf Jubeil is situated on a terrace along the Wadi Nib outlet of the Sebastiya Valley, with an approximate elevation of 400 meters above sea level. It is 2.5 kilometers east of the town of Sebastia. Other nearby localities include Ijnisinya to the south, Yasid to the east and Beit Imrin to the north. The nearby Ein Sharqiya spring serves as a source of water and there are 30 cisterns in the village.

History
Sherds from the late  Roman, Byzantine, early Muslim and Medieval eras have been found here.

Ottoman era
In 1596, Nisf Jubeil appeared in Ottoman tax registers as "Jubayl", a village in the nahiya of Jabal Sami in the liwa of Nablus. It had a population of 30 Muslim households and 36 Christian households. They  paid a fixed tax-rate of 33.3% on agricultural products, including  wheat, barley, summer crops, olive trees, goats and beehives; a total of 10,040  akçe. 1/3 of the revenues went to a Waqf.

In 1838 there were approximately 200 Christians, including a priest living in the village. The Christians were of the Greek Orthodox faith.

Victor Guérin found an ancient sarcophage in Nisf Jubeil, used as a trough. He estimated there were 300 inhabitants, including some Christians. In 1882, Nisf Jubeil  was described as "a small village in an open valley, with a spring to the east and olives. Some of the inhabitants are Greek Christians."

British Mandate era
In the 1922 census of Palestine conducted by the British Mandate of Palestine, its population was 162 (including 88 Christians), increasing to 210 (including 105 Christians) in the 1931 census.

In the 1945 statistics the population was 260; 80 Muslims and 180 Christians,
while the  total land area  was recorded as 5,054 dunams. Of this, 890 dunams were plantations and irrigable land, 2,443 used for cereals, while 28 dunams were built-up land.

Jordanian era
In the wake of the 1948 Arab–Israeli War, and after the 1949 Armistice Agreements, Nisf Jubeil came under Jordanian rule.

In 1961, the population of  Nisf Jubeil was  228, of whom 50 were Christian.

1967-present
Since the Six-Day War in 1967,  Nisf Jubeil  has been under Israeli occupation, and according to the Israeli census of that year, the population of Nisf Jubeil stood at 221, of whom 14 were registered as having come  from Israel.

In 1979 Nisf Jubeil's built-up area amounted to 25 dunams. Its village center contained a few old houses, two Greek Orthodox churches and a mosque, called the Nisf Jubeil Mosque. The mayor of the village is currently Adil Barakat.  Nisf Jubeil has a mixed population of Christians and Muslims.

References

Bibliography

External links
 Welcome To Nisf Jubeil
Survey of Western Palestine, Map 11:   IAA, Wikimedia commons
 Nifs Jubeil, aerial photo, Applied Research Institute–Jerusalem (ARIJ)

Nablus Governorate
Palestinian Christian communities
Villages in the West Bank